Burwash may refer to:

Places
 Burwash, East Sussex, England
 Burwash, Ontario, Canada
 Burwash Hall, second oldest of the residence buildings at Victoria College, Toronto, Ontario, Canada
 Burwash Landing, Yukon, Canada
People
 Nathanael Burwash (1839–1918), Canadian Methodist minister and university administrator
 Peter Burwash Canadian tennis player